Posh is a 1980 album released by R&B singer Patrice Rushen,  her third album for Elektra Records and sixth album overall. The album was recently re-released on Wounded Bird Records, as were several other Rushen albums from the time. Following the Pizzazz album, Posh was the continuation of a string of R&B/pop albums that established Rushen as an R&B singer.

"Look Up!," "I Need Your Love," "The Funk Won't Let You Down," "Time Will Tell" highlighted Patrice's reach into R&B territory. Whereas, songs such as the Stevie Wonder-esque "I Need Your Love" and the rock-leaning "Time Will Tell" were representative of her new progressive sound.

This album was released just before her 1982 breakthrough album, Straight from the Heart.

Track listing
"Never Gonna Give You Up (Won't Let You Be)" (Patrice Rushen, Freddie Washington) - 6:50
"Don't Blame Me" (Patrice Rushen, Angela Rushen, Clarence Bell) - 6:31
"Look Up!" (Patrice Rushen, Charles Mims, Jr., Sheree Brown) - 3:41
"I Need Your Love" (Patrice Rushen, Charles Mims, Jr., Angela Rushen) - 4:25
"Time Will Tell" (Patrice Rushen, Angela Rushen) - 5:09
"The Dream" (Patrice Rushen, Washington, Freddie Brown) - 4:54
"The Funk Won't Let You Down" (Patrice Rushen) - 7:35
"This Is All I Really Know" (Patrice Rushen, Lynn Davis); Featuring Lynn Davis - 4:41

Personnel 
 Patrice Rushen – lead and backing vocals, percussion, arrangements, acoustic piano (1, 5, 7, 8), synth solo (1), rhythm arrangements (1, 3, 4), electric piano (2, 4-7), synthesizers (2), bass (3), synth strings (4), vocal arrangements (8)
 Charles Mims Jr. – acoustic piano (3), synthesizers (3, 4), rhythm arrangements (3, 4)
 Paul Jackson Jr. – guitar (1, 2, 5, 7), acoustic guitar (6)
 David T. Walker – guitar (1, 6, 8)
 Wali Ali – lead vocals (1), guitar (2, 4)
 Marlo Henderson – guitar (3, 5, 7)
 Freddie Washington – bass (1, 2, 4-8), backing vocals (1), rhythm arrangements (1)
 James Gadson – drums (1, 8)
 Leon "Ndugu" Chancler – drums (2, 3, 6)
 Melvin Webb – drums (4, 5)
 Gerry Brown – drums (7)
 Eddie "Bongo" Brown – percussion (1, 3)
 Kenneth Yerke – high whistling (6)
 Roy Galloway – backing vocals (1, 5-8)
 Lynn Davis – backing vocals (3-8), vocal ad-lib solo (8), vocal arrangements (8)
 Wanda Vaughn – backing vocals (3)
 Jim Gilstrap – backing vocals (7, 8)

Handclaps
 Kevin R. Carter Sr.
 Ulysses Duprée
 Tony Lewis
 Charles Mims Jr.
 Lindsey Redmond
 Larry Robinson 
 Patrice Rushen
 Freddie Washington

Horns
 Don Myrick – alto saxophone
 William Green – tenor saxophone 
 Clay Lawrey – trombone, baritone
 Maurice Spears – bass trombone 
 Oscar Brashear – trumpet, flugelhorn 
 Raymond Lee Brown – trumpet, flugelhorn, flugelhorn solo (4), horn contractor

Strings
 Charles Veal Jr. – concertmaster, violin solo (6)
 Rosemary McLean – contractor
 Paula Hochhalter and Nils Oliver – cello
 Denyse Buffam, Rollice Dale, Virginia Majewski and Barbara Thomason –  viola 
 Israel Baker, Arnold Belnick, Assa Drori, Frank Foster, Endre Granat, Bob Sanov, Sheldon Sanov, Marcia Van Dyke, Dorothy Wade and Kenneth Yerke – violin

Production 
 Patrice Rushen – producer, executive producer 
 Charles Mims Jr. – producer
 Freddie Washington – production assistance (3)
 Peter Chaikin – recording engineer 
 Phil Moores – additional recording
 Jeff Titmus – additional rhythm recording (7)
 F. Byron Clark – remixing 
 Jeff Sanders – mastering 
 Crystal Sound (Los Angeles, California) – mastering location 
 Ron Coro – art direction, design  
 Norm Ung – art direction, design 
 Bobby Holland – photography 
 Shayne Fair – additional photography
 Pam Robinson – additional photography
 Joel Leonard – set design consultant

Later Samples
"This Is All I Really Know"
"These Are Our Heroes" by Nas from the album Street's Disciple
"The Dream"
"Never Gonna Give You Up (Won't Let You Go)"
"Two Takes It (feat. Carmen Castro)" by Mr. Oizo from the album "Lambs Anger"

References

External links 
 

Patrice Rushen albums
1980 albums
Elektra Records albums